Sebastian Rödl (born 1967) is a German philosopher and professor of practical philosophy at the University of Leipzig. From 2005 to 2012 he was professor of philosophy at the University of Basel.

Biography 
Rödl studied philosophy, musicology, German literature and history in Frankfurt am Main and Berlin, completing his doctoral dissertation under the supervision of Albrecht Wellmer. His work focuses on the self-conscious nature of human thought and action. His main influence is Hegel, and he sees himself as introducing and restating Hegel's Absolute Idealism in a historical moment that is wrought with misgivings about the merits and even the mere possibility of such a philosophy.

Publications 
 Self-Consciousness and Objectivity: An Introduction to Absolute Idealism, Harvard University Press 2018.
 Categories of the Temporal. An inquiry into the forms of the finite understanding, Harvard University Press 2012.
 Self-Consciousness, Cambridge/Mass., London: Harvard University Press 2007.
 "Law as the Reality of the Free Will", in A. Speer et al. (eds.), The New Desire for Metaphysics, Berlin: De Gruyter 2015.
 "Joint Action and Recursive Consciousness of Consciousness", Phenomenology and the Cognitive Sciences 14/4, 2015.

External links 
 Homepage Sebastian Rödl - Universität Leipzig

1967 births
Living people
Writers from Mainz
21st-century German philosophers
Continental philosophers